Klaus Fisch (1893–1975) was a German painter.  Because he painted many landscapes in the region of Eifel, he became known as "Eifelmaler" (the Eifel painter).

Exhibitions
Exhibition for the 80th Birthday at the Leopold-Hoesch Museum, Düren, 1973
Painters of the Eifel, anniversary exhibition to mark the 100th anniversary of the Eifelverein Bad Bertrich, 1988
Pictures of the Eifel in the guest house in Heimbach, 2007

See also
 List of German painters
 German art

20th-century German painters
20th-century German male artists
German male painters
1893 births
1975 deaths